Hingert is a surname. Notable people with the surname include:

Jack Hingert (born 1990), Australian-English soccer player
Maureen Hingert (born 1937), Sri Lankan dancer, model, actress, and beauty pageant title-holder

See also
Hilgert (disambiguation)